Hall Farm is a historic home and farm located in Prairie Township, Kosciusko County, Indiana. The house was built in 1871, and is a two-story, three bay, Italianate style frame dwelling.  It is topped by a low pitched hipped roof.  The front facade features a two-story, one bay portico with elaborate brackets and scrollwork.  Also on the property is a contributing timber frame English barn (c. 1871).

It was listed on the National Register of Historic Places in 1992.

References

Farms on the National Register of Historic Places in Indiana
Italianate architecture in Indiana
Houses completed in 1871
Buildings and structures in Kosciusko County, Indiana
National Register of Historic Places in Kosciusko County, Indiana